Texas Tavern is a restaurant and place of cultural significance in Roanoke, Virginia.

History

Issac N. (Nick) Bullington, an advance man for the Ringling Brothers Circus, opened the Texas Tavern in 1930. As part of his job for the circus, he traveled ahead of the circus booking shows. While on business in San Antonio, Texas, Bullington discovered a chile recipe that inspired his opening of the restaurant. Later, when Bullington settled down in Roanoke, he opened the restaurant in the parking lot of Thurman and Boone Furniture store on Church Ave. The Bullington family has passed ownership down generations. When Nick Bullington passed in 1942, his son James G. became the owner. James G. passed ownership to his son James N., who passed ownership to his son, James Matthew Bullington, in February of 2005. The latter Bullington still owns and operates the store today.

Little on the menu has changed since the restaurant's foundation. Besides chili, it features a variety of hamburgers and hot dogs, as well as a number of breakfast items. Soft drinks are served, but nothing alcoholic.

The "Cheesy Western", a cheeseburger with fried egg, pickles, and sweet relish, was identified as one of the 20 best burgers in Virginia by Thrillist in 2015.

Culture
Many famous individuals have visited Texas Tavern including Harry Connick, Jr., U.S. Vice President Mike Pence, Kevin Costner, and many others. Pence was heckled at Texas Tavern, creating media buzz about his likability. The restaurant has long been a fixture in the neighborhood, and is known for its regular customer base.

The restaurant is sometimes referred to as "Roanoke's Millionaires Club". It features a sign boasting, "We seat 1,000 people, 10 at a time."

References

External links 
 

Restaurants in Virginia
Hot dog restaurants in the United States
Fast-food chains of the United States
Regional restaurant chains in the United States
Restaurants established in 1930
1930 establishments in Virginia
Buildings and structures in Roanoke, Virginia